A  as defined by the Japanese government's Law for the Protection of Cultural Properties is a part of the Cultural Properties of high historical or artistic value such as structures, paintings, sculptures, handicrafts, calligraphic works, ancient books, historic documents, archeological artifacts and other such items created in Japan. All objects which are not structures are called "works of fine arts and crafts.

Considered by the Japanese government to be, like all Cultural Properties, a precious legacy of the Japanese people, they are protected in various ways, and their export is either controlled or forbidden.

Tangible Cultural Properties can be Designated or Registered. The two terms imply different terms of protection under the law.

Designated Tangible Cultural Properties
To protect Japan's cultural heritage,  the country's government has established with the Law for the Protection of Cultural Properties a  under which it selects important items and designates them as Cultural Properties, imposing restrictions to their alteration, repair and export.

The law then categorizes Cultural Properties according to their characteristics. Concrete items of high historical or artistic value such as structures, paintings, sculptures, handicrafts, calligraphic works, ancient books, historic documents, archeological artifacts and other such items are classified as Tangible Cultural Properties. All objects which are not structures are referred to as "works of fine arts and crafts.

(In this last case the designating agency is often not specified.) Designations of different level can coexist. For example, Sankei-en, a traditional Japanese-style garden in Naka Ward, Yokohama, owns both city designated and nationally designated Important Cultural Properties.

As of April 2009, 2344 sites (including 214 National Treasures) and 4272 structures (including 262 National Treasures) have been designated Tangible Cultural Properties.

Any alteration to Important Cultural Properties and National Treasures requires governmental permission. Conservation work is performed by an item's owner, with financial support available for large expenses. Because many items are made of wood, bark and other flammable materials, they are often extremely susceptible to fires. Owners are therefore given subsidies to install fire and other disaster prevention systems.

In the "works of fine arts and crafts" sector, as of April, 2009 1956 paintings (157), 2628 sculptures (126), 2415 artifacts (252), 1865 calligraphic works and old books (223), 726 ancient texts (59), 567 archeological items (43) and 154 historical items (2) were designated Important Cultural Properties or National Treasures

Any intervention on this type of Cultural Property requires previous approval and their exportation is forbidden, except when authorized. The National Treasury supports the conservation and restoration of these items, and the Commissioner for Cultural Affairs provides technical assistance for their administration, restoration, public display and other activities.

Registered Tangible Cultural Properties
So far there this category includes 7407 buildings and 9 works of fine arts and crafts.

Compared to designated Important Cultural Properties and National Treasures,  entail fewer responsibilities for the owner. Loss, damage, change of ownership and intended changes that affect more than 25 percent of the visible surface need to be announced. On the other hand, the owner is eligible for low interest loans for maintenance and repairs, subsidies for an architect and tax reductions of up to 50 percent. This new protection level is based on notification, guidance, and advice, and aims at voluntary protection of cultural properties by their owners.

See also
For lists of National Treasures of Japan, see Lists of National Treasures of Japan
Cultural Properties of Japan
Historic Monuments of Ancient Kyoto (Kyoto, Uji and Otsu Cities)
Lists of Cultural Properties of the Philippines

Notes

References

Bibliography

External links
 Introduction to Cultural Properties, Agency for Cultural Affairs 

Cultural Properties of Japan
National Treasures of Japan
Japanese culture